The 2003 FIRA Women's European Championship was the seventh edition of the tournament and featured only eight teams, divided into pools A and B. For the first time the A and B pools were also organised as separate competitions in different venues, and in different weeks. The A Pool in Malmö was won by Spain, and the B pool by Netherlands. France and Spain were represented by their respective "A" teams.

Netherlands' win was the first time a host team had won an official FIRA championship (France had won the unofficial title as hosts in 1988)

Pool A (at Malmö, Sweden)

Bracket

Semi-finals

3rd/4th Place

Final

Pool B (at Amsterdam, Netherlands)

Bracket

Semi-finals

3rd/4th Place

Final

See also 
 Women's international rugby

External links 
 FIRA website

2003
2003 rugby union tournaments for national teams
International rugby union competitions hosted by Sweden
International rugby union competitions hosted by the Netherlands
2002–03 in European women's rugby union